Kamal Ahmad (born March 28, 1965) is a Bangladesh-born, now US national, educator and social entrepreneur. He led the creation of the Asian University for Women located in Chittagong, Bangladesh in 2006.

Early life 

Ahmad was born in Dhaka, East Pakistan (now Bangladesh) to a family of educators.

At age 14, Ahmad established a series of internationally funded afternoon schools for adolescents who served as domestic workers in Dhaka. The first of his schools was set up on the side of an abandoned public road near the campus of the University of Dhaka. The Juvenile Literacy Programme that he started with international funding was possibly the first non-governmental initiative in the area of informal education for children in Bangladesh.  

In 1977, as a student of Class Seven at Dhaka's St. Joseph School, Kamal wrote to the Australian High Commissioner protesting the treatment of Australian aborigines, citing in particular the case of the distinguished Aboriginal painter Albert Namatjira.  Kamal's protest letter triggered the Australian High Commission to issue an eight-page rebuttal on the matter and he was invited to the Australian High Commission for a meeting to discuss the issues further. No change in Australian policy with respect to its treatment of aborigines was reported. 
 
Ahmad moved to the U.S. in 1980 to attend Phillips Exeter Academy. At Exeter, he led the Third World Society and the Student-Faculty Committee on Corporate Responsibility which focused on the question of corporate divestment from apartheid-era South Africa. Ahmad entered Harvard College in 1983. As a freshman, Ahmad founded and managed the Overseas Development Network, a consortium of 70 university student groups across the United States dedicated to the promotion of international development projects. In 1987, Ahmad won Time magazine's second annual College Achievement Award for "20 of the most outstanding juniors in America."

Family 
Ahmad's father was Professor Kamaluddin Ahmad, a famed biochemist who pioneered the study of biochemistry and nutritional sciences in the Indian subcontinent.  Professor Ahmad established one of the region's first biochemistry departments at the University of Dhaka in 1957.

Ahmad's grandfather, M.O. Ghani was one of the first Bengali-Indian Muslims to receive a Ph.D. in chemistry from the United Kingdom. He went on to become founder-vice chancellor of Bangladesh Agricultural University in Mymensingh, vice chancellor of the University of Dhaka, Pakistan's Ambassador to Tanzania and other East African countries, and an independent Member of Parliament in Bangladesh.

Career 

Following graduation from Harvard College in 1988, Ahmad served on the staffs of the World Bank; Rockefeller Foundation; UNICEF; and the General Counsel of the Asian Development Bank based in Manila, Philippines. In 1993, Ahmad entered University of Michigan Law School.

In 1998, Ahmad conceived and co-directed the World Bank/UNESCO Task Force on Higher Education & Society.

In September 2006, the Parliament of Bangladesh ratified the landmark Charter of the Asian University for Women. The Charter endowed the university with institutional autonomy, academic freedom, and embedded it in the principle of non-discrimination. In 2005 and 2006, the Open Society Foundations and the Bill & Melinda Gates Foundation provided the start-up funds which enabled AUW to become operational in 2008.

Asian University for Women 
Located in Chittagong, Bangladesh, Asian University for Women (AUW) is the first of its kind—a regional liberal arts university dedicated to the education and leadership development of women drawn from diverse socio-economic backgrounds from across Asia and the Middle East.  

AUW is chartered by the Parliament of Bangladesh as an independent international university.  To date, over $100 million in private philanthropic support has been contributed to this initiative.  In addition, the Government of Bangladesh has granted 140 acres of land for a purpose-designed campus.  

At its core, AUW is organized to overcome communal identities and recognize our common human predicament and potential.  AUW also promotes a preferential option for educating women who are first in their family to enter university. In founding AUW, Kamal pioneered a number of unconventional approaches to education, including targeted recruitment of women from some of the region's most oppressed and underserved communities, including Rohingya refugees, Bangladeshi textile factory workers, and women from remote highlands and creating a standards rubric that is flexible at entry but uncompromising at exit.

Kamal developed the triad of "Courage, Outrage at Injustice, and Empathy" as key indicators of leadership potential, which has informed the university's search for talent among incoming students. As of 2020, AUW draws students from 18 countries and has spurred a new network of almost one thousand rising women leaders from across the region in its alumnae.  Kamal has advocated for the use of performing arts as an instrument for asserting AUW's secularity as well as for community building in a diverse setting.

Awards and affiliations 

Ahmad is a recipient of a number of awards including the United Nations Gold Peace Medal & Citation Scroll, given by the Paul G. Hoffman Awards Fund for "outstanding contribution to national and international development." In 2002, Ahmad was elected as a "Global Leader for Tomorrow" by the World Economic Forum. Ahmad was also given the John Phillips Award from Phillips Exeter Academy, his alma mater. The award is given to "an alumnus or alumna of the academy, still living at the time of nomination, whose life demonstrates John Phillips' ideal of goodness and knowledge united in noble character and usefulness to mankind. It is the highest honor accorded by the academy to an alumnus.

Kamal serves on a number of not-for-profit boards including the Board of Trustees of the Harvard-Yenching Institute and the Leadership Board of the Beth Israel Lahey Hospitals at Harvard University.  He is a member of the Council of Luminaries of the Yidan Foundation created by one of the founders of the Chinese internet company Tencent.

References 

1965 births
Living people
American lawyers
Harvard College alumni
Phillips Exeter Academy alumni
University of Michigan Law School alumni
American chief executives
People associated with Fried, Frank, Harris, Shriver & Jacobson